Taladar-e Nakhlestan (also Romanized as Ţalādar-e Nakhlestān; also known as Ţalādar) is a village in Piveshk Rural District, Lirdaf District, Jask County, Hormozgan Province, Iran. At the 2006 census, its population was 50, in 11 families.

References 

Populated places in Jask County